This is a list of counties of England, ordered by population as at the 1971 census.  The figures presented here include all the administrative counties with their associated county boroughs.  York is accounted for as part of the West Riding, and Lincoln as part of Kesteven.

See also
List of counties of England by population

References
1971 census

1971 United Kingdom census
Lists of counties of England
1971 in England